Roy Earl "Red" Randall (April 26, 1904 – May 18, 1974) was an American football player, coach of football, basketball, and baseball, and college athletics administrator.  He grew up in Brockton, Massachusetts, and played at the quarterback position on the undefeated 1926 Brown Bears football team that became known as the "Iron Men" and compiled a 9–0–1 record. He was selected by the All-America Board as the first-team quarterback on the 1926 College Football All-America Team. In the 1930s, he became a football, basketball, and baseball coach, and later athletic director, at Haverford College in suburban Philadelphia.  He retired in 1969.

References

External links
 

1904 births
1974 deaths
All-American college football players
American football quarterbacks
Basketball coaches from Massachusetts
Brown Bears football players
Haverford Fords athletic directors
Haverford Fords baseball coaches
Haverford Fords football coaches
Haverford Fords men's basketball coaches
Players of American football from Massachusetts
Sportspeople from Brockton, Massachusetts
Virginia Cavaliers baseball coaches
Virginia Cavaliers football coaches
Virginia Cavaliers men's basketball coaches